Calanticaria is a genus of flowering plants belonging to the family Asteraceae.

Its native range is Eastern Mexico.

Species:

Calanticaria bicolor 
Calanticaria brevifolia 
Calanticaria greggii 
Calanticaria inegii 
Calanticaria oligantha

References

Heliantheae
Asteraceae genera